I-4: Loafing and Camouflage or I-4: Loafing and Exemption (/I-4:Loufa kai Apallagi) is a 2008 Greek comedy film written and directed by Vassilis Katsikis. The film was one of the highest-grossing Greek films of its release year.

Plot
Five young men try to be exempted from army using their high social interfaces. But a scandal related with many exemptions from army breaks out and the five men are compelled to enlist. Finally they enlist in category I-4 that means they serve as unarmed. Next they go to serve as auxiliary unit in a commando troops. There, the soldiers are forced to face the cruel behaviour of commandos. But, in this camp the Greek colonel play an army role play game with the Turkish colonel of the Turkish camp, in the other coast of Aegean. This game gives to the I-4 soldiers the opportunity to avenge the commandos. Finally the conflict between commandos and I-4 upset the camp, but the I-4 soldiers manage to avoid the penalties.

Cast
Giorgos Kimoulis as Colonel Theofilos Theofilou 
Thanasis Tsaltabasis as Thanasis Kioubasidis
Haris Mavroudis as Alkis Koumentakis
Petros Lagoutis as Miltos Mavreas
Kostas Fragolias as Alexandros Galatis
Stathis Panagiotidis as Theo Foutidis
Maria Korinthiou as Eleni Theofilou
Isavela Kogevina as Maria Theofilou

References

External links

Greek comedy films
2008 films
2000s Greek-language films